Diogenes Euergetes was the Macedonian garrison commander in Athens, who died in 229 BC. He handed over the Port of Piraeus to the Athenians, making Athens free from foreign military occupation for the first time in 65 years. "For reasons that are not explained in any surviving text", he was named the "benefactor" (Euergetes) of the city, along with a festival, the Diogeneia (Διογένεια), and gymnasium, the Diogeneion (Διογένειον), having been set up in his honor.

References 

Ancient Greek garrison commanders
229 BC deaths